Mae Lan is a district (amphoe) of Pattani province, southern Thailand.

History
The minor district (king amphoe) Mae Lan was formed on 1 April 1989 by splitting off three tambons from Khok Pho district. On 7 September 1995, it was upgraded to a full district.

, the provisions of Thailand's Internal Security Act remain imposed on Mae Lan District. Internal security restrictions, maintained by Thailand's Internal Security Operations Command (ISOC) can result in curfews, prohibited entry, or prohibited transport of goods. It is considered one step below the imposition of full martial law.

Geography
Neighboring districts are (from the west clockwise): Khok Pho, Nong Chik, and Yarang of Pattani Province; and Mueang Yala of Yala province.

Administration
The district is divided into three sub-districts (tambons), which are further subdivided into 22 villages (mubans). There are no municipal (thesaban) areas. There are three tambon administrative organizations (TAO).

References

External links
amphoe.com

Districts of Pattani province